The Beneteau Oceanis 321 is a French sailboat, that was designed by Group Finot and first built in 1995.

Production
The boat was built by Beneteau in France starting in 1995, with 848 examples completed, but it is now out of production.

The Oceanis 321 design was also sold under the names Moorings 321, Moorings 322, Stardust 322 and Stardust 323. The Oceanis 321 Clipper was a version with many options included as standard equipment.

Design

The Oceanis 321 is a small recreational keelboat, built predominantly of fiberglass. It has a masthead sloop rig, an internally-mounted spade-type rudder and a fixed fin keel with a weighted bulb. It displaces  and carries  of ballast.

The Oceanis 321 is fitted with a Swedish Volvo diesel engine.

See also
List of sailing boat types

Similar sailboats
Bayfield 30/32
B-Boats B-32
C&C 32
C&C 99
Catalina 320
Contest 32 CS
Hunter 32 Vision
Hunter 326
J/32
Mirage 32
Nonsuch 324
Ontario 32
Ranger 32

References

External links

Keelboats
Sailing yachts
1990s sailboat type designs
Sailboat types built by Beneteau
Sailboat type designs by Groupe Finot